Waza or WAZA may refer to:

 WAZA (FM), a radio station (107.7 FM) licensed to Liberty, Mississippi, United States 
 World Association of Zoos and Aquariums
 Detroit Waza, an American arena soccer team
 Waza National Park in Cameroon
 a term used in Chad and Sudan to describe long metal trumpets elsewhere known as kakaki or malakat
 The House of Vasa
 Waza, an annual event hosted by Heroku for art and technique of application development
 Wasa, also called Wazad, a pharaoh of the 14th dynasty of Egypt
 a line of products by Boss Corporation